Leo Morgan may refer to:

Leo S. Morgan (born 1879), Australian rules footballer
Léo Morgan, French officer and composer of the Moroccan national anthem
Leo W. Morgan (born 1913), Australian rules footballer